

Events
Peire Bremon Ricas Novas and Sordello attack each other in a string of sirventes

Births
 Tran Thanh Tong (died 1290), Vietnamese poet and ruler
 Yunus Emre (died 1321), Turkish poet and Sufi mystic

Deaths

13th-century poetry
Poetry